The Grand Prix GSB (Grand Saint Bernard) is an elite women's professional one-day road bicycle race held in El Salvador.

Past winners

References 

 
Cycle races in El Salvador
Women's road bicycle races